Celaenorrhinus ovalis, also known as Evans' orange sprite, is a species of butterfly in the family Hesperiidae. It is found in Sierra Leone, Liberia, Ivory Coast, Ghana, Nigeria, Cameroon, the Republic of the Congo, the Central African Republic, the Democratic Republic of the Congo, Uganda and western Kenya. The habitat consists of forests.

References

Butterflies described in 1937
ovalis